Nemophora amatella is a moth of the Adelidae family. It is a trans-Palearctic species which is widely distributed in Asia (including Siberia, Korea, and Japan), as well as in northern Europe.

The wingspan is 17–24 mm. Adults are on wing in June and July in northern Europe.

References

External links
Lepiforum.de

Moths described in 1892
Adelidae
Moths of Japan
Moths of Europe
Moths of Asia
Taxa named by Otto Staudinger